The Kumeyaay, also known as Tipai-Ipai or by their historical Spanish name Diegueño, is a tribe of Indigenous peoples of the Americas who live at the northern border of Baja California in Mexico and the southern border of California in the United States. Their Kumeyaay language belongs to the Yuman–Cochimí language family.

The Kumeyaay consist of three related groups, the Ipai, Tipai and Kamia. The San Diego River loosely divided the Ipai and the Tipai historical homelands, while the Kamia lived in the eastern desert areas. The Ipai lived to the north, from Escondido to Lake Henshaw, while the Tipai lived to the south, in lands including the Laguna Mountains, Ensenada, and Tecate. The Kamia lived to the east in an area that included Mexicali and bordered the Salton Sea.

Name

The Kumeyaay or Tipai-Ipai were formerly known as the Kamia or Diegueños, the former Spanish name applied to the Mission Indians living along the San Diego River. They are referred to as the Kumiai in Mexico.

The term Kumeyaay translates as "Those who face the water from a cliff", with the word meyaay meaning "steep" or "cliff".

Language
All languages and dialects spoken by the Kumeyaay belong to the Delta–California branch of the Yuman language family, to which several other linguistically-distinct, but related, groups also belong (including the Cocopa, Quechan, Paipai, and Kiliwa). Native speakers contend that within their territory, all Kumeyaay (Ipai/Tipai) can understand and speak to each other, if even after a brief familiarization.

Nomenclature and tribal distinctions are not widely agreed upon. According to Margaret Langdon, who is credited with doing much of the early work on documenting the language, the general scholarly consensus recognized three separate languages: Ipai (Iipay) (Northern Kumeyaay), Kumeyaay proper (including the Kamia/Kwaaymii), and Tipai (Southern Kumeyaay) in northern Baja California. Katherine Luomala considered that the wide range of dialect variations reflected only two distinct languages, Ipai and Tipai, a view mostly supported by other researchers.

History

Pre-European contact 
Evidence of the settlement in what is today considered Kumeyaay territory may go back 12,000 years. 7000 BCE marked the emergence of two cultural traditions: the California Coast and Valley tradition and the Desert tradition. The Kumeyaay had land along the Pacific Ocean from present Oceanside, California in the north to south of Ensenada, Mexico and extending east to the Colorado River. The Cuyamaca complex, a late Holocene complex in San Diego County is related to the Kumeyaay peoples. The Kumeyaay tribe also used to inhabit what is now a popular state park, known as Torrey Pines State Natural Reserve.

One view holds that historic Tipai-Ipai emerged around 1000 years ago, though a "proto-Tipai-Ipai culture" had been established by about 5000 BCE. Katherine Luomola suggests that the "nucleus of later Tipai-Ipai groups" came together around AD 1000. The Kumeyaay themselves believe that they have lived in San Diego for 12,000 years. At the time of European contact, Kumeyaay comprised several autonomous bands with 30 patrilineal clans.

Spanish exploration and colonization 
The first European to visit the region was Juan Rodríguez Cabrillo in 1542. He had initially met with the Kumeyaay, but this did not lead to any colonial settlement. Sebastián Vizcaíno also visited in 1602 and met with a band of Kumeyaay during the feast of San Diego de Alcalá, thus giving the region of San Diego its name; however, this also did not lead to colonial settlement.

In 1769, the Portolá expedition anchored in San Diego Bay and, once on land, traveled to the Kumeyaay village of Cosoy (Kosa'aay) to recover and resupply. After their recovery, the Spanish established a presidio over the village and the Misión San Diego de Alcalá, incorporating the village into the settlement of San Diego. In 1769, under the Spanish Mission system, bands living near Misión San Diego de Alcalá (overlooking the San Diego River, in present-day Mission Valley), were called Diegueños; later bands, living near Mission San Luis Rey de Francia, were called the Luiseño. The Spaniards brought with them new, non-native, invasive flora and domestic animals, which brought about some level of degradation to local ecology. This included grazing and foraging livestock animals such as pigs, goats, sheep, cattle, horses, donkeys, and various birds, like chickens, pheasants and ducks; the latter dirtying local water sources considerably.

After years of sexual assaults from the Spanish soldiers in the Presidio, and physical torture of Mission Indians using metal-tipped whips (by Mission staff), the Tipai-Kumeyaay villages led a revolt against the Spanish, burning down Mission San Diego and killing Father Luis Jayme along with two others. Missionaries and church leaders “apologized” and forgave the Kumeyaay, rebuilding their mission closer to the Kumeyaay village of Nipaquay or Nipawai. Ultimately, the Spanish solidified their control over the area until the end of the mission era.

Early Mexican rancho era

First Mexican Empire and First Mexican Republic period
The Mexican Empire assumed ownership of Kumeyaay lands after defeating Spain in the Mexican War of Independence in 1821. The following year, Mexican troops confiscated all coastal lands from the Kumeyaay in 1822, granting much of the land to Mexican settlers, who became known as Californios, to develop the land for agriculture, beginning the California rancho era.

Kumeyaay fell victim to smallpox and malaria epidemics in 1827 and 1832, reducing the Kumeyaay population.

Various disputes culminated to a skirmish between the Kumeyaay and Mexican soldiers stationed in San Diego in 1826, killing 26 Kumeyaay. This provoked Lt. Juan M. Ibarra to lead several attacks on Kumeyaay-controlled lands, killing 28 people in his attack on Santa Ysabel.

After decades of debates and delays, the missions in Alta California were secularized in 1833, and Ipai and Tipais lost their lands; band members had to choose between becoming serfs, trespassers, rebels, or fugitives. This increased tensions between the Kumeyaay and the Mexican settlers as the Kumeyaay economic instability threatened the security of Mexican and American merchants transiting through the area.

Centralist Republic of Mexico period
Under territorial governor José Figueroa, some of the Kumeyaay from Mission San Diego were allowed to resettle and establish San Pasqual pueblo in 1835, who would later become the San Pasqual Band of Diegueno Mission Indians. The Kumeyaay pueblo fought against hostile bands and protected Mexican settlers, with a decisive victory over an anti-Christian uprising and capturing its leader, Claudio.

With conditions worsening, the Kumeyaay led an attack on Rancho Tecate in 1836, forcing the alcalde of San Diego to send an expedition to suppress the Kumeyaay, but returned unsuccessfully. Because of the failed venture, Mexico failed to adequately suppress talk of Californian secession from American settlers in northern Alta California.

Further Kumeyaay raids on El Cajon (1836) and Rancho Jamul (1837) threatened the security of San Diego, as many residents of San Diego fled the city. The Kumeyaay were able to attack San Diego in the late 1830s. Kumeyaay advancements into Rancho Bernardo in the north and San Ysidro and Tijuana to the south at the end of the decade threatened to cut off San Diego from the rest of the Centralist Republic of Mexico. The Kumeyaay made preparations to lay siege on San Diego in the early 1840s and launched a second attack on San Diego in June 1842. However, San Diego managed to defend itself once more. While the siege failed, the Kumeyaay managed to control much of the south, east, and most of the north of the settlement, with the town becoming dependent on sea access maintain connections to the rest of Mexico. Together with Quechan resistance in the east, the Kumeyaay cut off Alta California of all land routes to the rest of the Mexican republic between the Colorado River and the Pacific Ocean up until the Mexican–American War, further threatening Mexican control of the southern Alta California coast. The Kumeyaay prevented Mexican usage of the ranchos around San Diego and evicted most of the Californios in the area by 1844, and continued launching raids deep into the Mexican controlled coast up until the start of the Mexican–American War.

Mexican-American War

During the Mexican–American War, the Kumeyaay were initially neutral. The Kumeyaay of the San Pasqual pueblo were evacuated as the Americans approached the town. The Mexicans and the Californios were victorious over the Americans at the Battle of San Pasqual. A Kumeyaay leader, Panto, called on the Mexicans to cease hostilities with the Americans so that the Kumeyaay could tend to the wounded Americans, to which provided Panto and the San Pasqual Kumeyaay resupplied the Americans and helped ensure the American capture of the Pueblo de Los Ángeles and San Diego.

Late modern era
After the Mexican–American War, Kumeyaay lands were split between the U.S. and Mexico through the Mexican Cession resulting from the Treaty of Guadalupe Hidalgo.

Yuma War and California genocide

In 1851, San Diego County unilaterally charged property taxes on Native American tribes in the county and threatened to confiscate land and property should they fail to pay up. This led to the San Diego Tax Rebellion of 1851 or "Garra's Revolt", with the destruction of Warner's Ranch led by the Cupeño, opening up a new western front of the Yuma War. The Kumeyaay agreed to join the revolt alongside Cahuilla, Cocopah, and Quechan warriors, but made no military commitments to attack San Diego or capture Fort Yuma.

However, not all Kumeyaay bands fought on the same side of the Yuma war; the San Pasqual Band of Kumeyaay fought against the Quechan campaign to attack San Diego and defeated the Quechan in the San Pasqual Valley.

The Kumeyaay withdrew from the war after the capitulation of the Cahuilla to the US and the failed attempt to capture Fort Yuma.

Compared to other California tribes, the Kumeyaay did not face the same magnitude of destruction and exploitation under the California genocide. This was due to the strategic positioning of the Kumeyaay and the lack of gold in the mountains. Additionally, Mexican officials in Baja California Territory threatened to intervene in the conflict if they committed any atrocities on tribes along the border, due to a mix of Mexican sympathies towards the Native Californians and a fear of refugees coming across the border.

Establishment of Kumeyaay reservations in the U.S.
On January 7, 1852, representatives of a number of Kumeyaay clans, including Panto, met with Commissioner Oliver M. Wozencraft and negotiated the Treaty of Santa Ysabel. The agreement was part of the "18 Treaties" of California, negotiated to protect Indian land rights. After the 18 Treaties were completed, the documents were sent to the United States Senate for approval. Under pressure from white settlers and the California Senate delegation, the treaties were all rejected.

From 1870 to 1910, American settlers seized lands, including arable and native gathering lands. In 1875, President Ulysses S. Grant created reservations in the area, and additional lands were placed under trust patent status after the passage of the 1891 Act for the Relief of Mission Indians. The reservations tended to be small and lacked adequate water supplies. The situation was made worse during the famine of 1880–1881, which forced many Kumeyaay to survive by accepting charity from whites, as they faced diseases, starvation and attacks from white settlers.

Some Kumeyaay chose not to establish a reservation inland and sought work in San Diego, many of whom migrated to the Kumeyaay village in what is now Balboa Park led by the Florida Canyon Kumeyaay Band. The village experienced growth after receiving immigrants from other Kumeyaay bands as well as from other indigenous Californian and Bajeno tribes, who sought work in the city, transforming the village into a neighborhood integrated into the city fabric. The village was then demolished in the early 1900s in preparation for the 1915 Panama-California Exposition, displacing the residents of the village.

In 1932, the Coapan Kumeyaay living and farming on the San Diego River were removed to make way for the El Capitan Dam and Reservoir and relocated their inhabitants at the Barona Reservation and the Viejas Reservation, further cutting down the agricultural capacity of the Kumeyaay reservations.

Kumeyaay in the Mexican Revolution (1910–1911)
During the Mexican Revolution, the Magonistas gained the support of the Kumeyaay with an enthusiastic base, particularly in the Tecate region; many Kumeyaay from both sides of the border were enticed by their anarcho-syndicalist message of indigenous liberation from the Mexican and American colonial nation-states starting with the end of the Porfirio Díaz dictatorship. The Kumeyaay supported the Magonistas as guides throughout the land, whose aid allowed them to control Mexicali, Tecate, and Tijuana during the Magonista rebellion of 1911. However, the Kumeyaay did not participate in much of the active fighting in the Magonista Rebellion, and did not participate with Cocopah, Kiliwa, and Paipai tribes in raiding on small towns or looting Chinese-Mexican businesses in the region, and may have even smuggled Chinese-Mexican refugees to the American side of the border. By the end of June, the rebellion was suppressed by the Madero administration.

After the revolution, the ban on Ejidos and other forms of communal living were lifted and the Kumeyaay were able resume their traditional communal way of life legitimately with their communities in Valle de Las Palmas, Peña Blanca, and their five other reservations.

Contemporary era

Kumeyaay-American economy and casino industry
Kumeyaay people supported themselves by farming and agricultural wage labor; however, a 20-year drought in the mid-20th century crippled the region's dry farming economy. For their common welfare, several reservations in the US formed the non-profit Kumeyaay, Inc.

Cuts in Native American welfare programs under the Reagan and Bush Sr. administrations forced the reservation to find other means of income and capitalize on industries not possible off-reservation.

In 1982, the Barona Band won its case in Barona Group of the Capitan Grande Band of Mission Indians v. Duffy (1982) to operate high-stakes bingo games, leading to the expansion of many Kumeyaay bingo operators into the casino industry. This helped establish Las Vegas-style gaming operations in the reservations in the region, evaporating reservation unemployment and poverty in a short time. In total, the Kumeyaay operate six casinos: Barona Valley Ranch Resort and Casino, Sycuan Resort and Casino, Viejas Casino & Resort, Valley View Casino and Hotel, Golden Acorn Casino and Travel Center, and Jamul Casino.

In response to the casino construction boom, the San Diego County government maintained a policy of opposition to any growth in tribal expansion under any circumstance in fears that land would be used to build more casinos, which broke down relations between the County and the Kumeyaay, Payomkawichum (Luiseño), and Kuupangaxwichem (Cupeño) tribal reservation governments. This San Diego County Board of Supervisors repealed these policies in May 2021.

Kumeyaay-Mexican economy and the wine tourism industry
On the Mexican side of the border, Kumeyaay reservations manufacture traditional craftwork to sell on the American side of the border with partnering Kumeyaay souvenir gift shops and casinos.

Many Kumeyaay there have moved into urban areas to seek better employment opportunities compared to their agrarian employment on the reservation. The depopulation of their reservations has allowed neighboring non-native Ejidos to encroach on their lands.

The Kumeyaay reservations on the Mexican side of the border have largely retained their traditional heritage. Some reservations faced water shortages, making it difficult to continue agricultural operation. This led many communities to enter wine-tasting and tourism industries in the Guadalupe Valley. Many bands began launching wine tours and festivals to attract tourists and foreign visitors from southern California and cruise passengers stopping at the Port of Ensenada.

Kumeyaay and the US-Mexican border

In 1998, the Kumeyaay established the Kumeyaay Border task force to work with federal immigration officials to secure free passage of Baja Kumeyaay bands to visit the US Kumeyaay bands and ensure their rights to protected graves and artifacts protected by the Native American Graves Protection and Repatriation Act of 1990.

However, border wall construction accelerated in 2020 and Kumeyaay representatives at the border to protect and preserve Kumeyaay artifacts were turned away from the construction area. This sparked protests among the bands and Kumeyaay women organized to lead a protest at the border in July. The La Posta Band filed a lawsuit in August against the Trump administration seeking to block further construction of the border wall through their sacred cemetery (burial sites).

Society

Social structure

Prior to Western assimilation, the Kumeyaay were organized into bands or clans called sibs or shiimull, which were grounded in family lineages with each sib home for 5 to 15 families. Each sib had their own territory and had the right to enforce land property rights in punishing thieves and trespassers. However, Kumeyaay did recognize the right to water and were also obligated to share food with visitors.

The Kumeyaay had a patriarchal society where the position of chief, or Kwaapaay, was inherited from the father to son, although widows were sometimes permitted to assume the position. It was the Kwaapaay's role to protect traditions, hold ceremonies, and resolve disputes and was responsible for political, religious, and economic activities of the sib. Future Kwaapaays were often selected by a Kwaapaay of another with no family relations to ensure impartiality.

Kwaapaays were also accompanied by assistants and had a council of Kuseyaays. Kuseyaays were made up of male or female priests, doctors, and other specialists in the fields of health, ecology, resource management, tradition, and religion. Kuseyaays could be called by the kwaapaay to provide information or to make decisions for the sib's welfare. Each family in the sib was allowed to follow and participate in the decision making, or could leave the sib and pursue their own decision.

The Kumeyaay practiced arranged marriage made by parents of different sibs. The future husband was expected to demonstrate his ability to hunt and needed to present the future bride the game he had killed. The bride would move into the husband's sib once they were married. Marriage relations were also made between sibs and other neighboring tribal groups as a gesture of peace between warring groups or as part of a trade relationship.

Shelter

Kumeyaay generally lived in dome-shaped homes made from branches and covered with leaves of willow or tule, which the Kumeyaay called 'ewaa. These structures had a hole at the top to let smoke out and rocks along its base to keep out wind and small animals. Some Kumeyaay who lived in the mountains made their home out of slabs of bark.

These structures were often temporary, as they burned down their homes when families moved or if someone died in the house.

Clothing
During warm seasons, men wore nothing except for a hide breechcloth to hold tools while women wore an apron or a skirt made from willow or elderberry bark. In the colder months, they would wear blankets made from willow bark or rabbit skins.

They wore agave sandals made from yucca and agave fibers when going over long distances, over sharp rocks, or hot sand. Some would wear bead necklaces as jewelry, with beads made of clam, abalone, or olivella shells. Additionally, men could get their nose pierced and women might have their chins tattooed.

The Kumeyaay started to abandon much of their traditional clothing after coming in contact with the Spanish, and adopted European-style clothing, wearing clothes that were normal in Latin America.

Diet
Acorns were a staple of the Kumeyaay diet, and made acorn mush they called shawii, which could be used in dough to make bread by grinding with a mano and a metate. Other grains like pinon nuts or chia seeds were also stone-ground and consumed. The Kumeyaay stored these grains in basket granaries made of willow leaves. They also consumed the leaves and fruits of the prickly pear and copal cactus, as well as cherries, plums, elderberries, and Manzanita berries. They also fermented many of these plants with water and honey to create alcohol.

They hunted for animals such as birds, rabbits, squirrels, and woodrats, as well as larger animals like antelope, deer, and mountain sheep. The Kumeyaay also ate more nutrient-rich insects such as crickets, grubs and grasshoppers.

Kamia Kumeyaay in the Imperial Valley practiced some forms of agriculture, producing maize, beans, and teparies. Like other Kumeyaay, though, they largely relied on gathering.

Economy and communication

The Ipai-Tipai Kumeyaay traded with the Kamia Kumeyaay to obtain obsidian from an area south of the Salton Sea. Within the Tipai-Ipai, the coastal Kumeyaay traded salt, seaweed, and abalone shells for acorns, agave, mesquite beans, and gourds from the mountain Kumeyaay. They also traded along the Pacific coast to obtain Olivella shell beads from the Chumash, as well as tribes along the Gulf of California and in the American Southwest as far east as to trade with the Zuni. Granite was also plentiful in Kumeyaay lands, which was used to trade for pestles, steatite, eagle feathers, and colored minerals for paint.

The Kumeyaay's maritime economy relied on shell fishing, and they built fishing boats, either balsa rafts made of reeds or dugout canoes. To support their maritime economy, they manufactured fishing spears, hooks, and nets made of agave fiber.

Upon Spanish arrival, woven baskets were highly prized by the Europeans, as these baskets were so well made that they could hold water and it was possible to cook food with these baskets in an open fire. The strong demand for Californian woven baskets in Mexican and European markets strengthened the basket weaving economy among the Kumeyaay.

The Kumeyaay had a system of trail runners who carried messages and announcements between bands, which notified the presence of the Spaniards prior to Cabrillo's arrival in San Diego.

Weaponry
The Kumeyaay were skilled in archery in order to hunt prey. Their arrows were made of wood, reeds, or cane, as well as chamise or greasewood plant for larger animals. Bows were made of mesquite or ash, as well as animal hides. They also equipped with throwing sticks better known as rabbit sticks, which were used to knock out small animals and were sometimes used in war.

Culture
The Kumeyaay has a continuous song and dance culture, of which many are still passed on to the next generation during special occasions. Occasions like the mourning of an important figure was honored by an Eagle Dance, and a War Dance accompanied those heading for battle. Men often sang songs with a rattle, while women supported the song through dance. Through the Mission, the Kumeyaay picked up skills in Western musical instruments, and joined the Mission choirs and orchestras.

They also had animal companions and domesticated mockingbirds and roadrunners as pets.

Reservation era Kumeyaay institutions
The Kumeyaay Community College was created by the Sycuan Band to serve the Kumeyaay-Diegueño Nation, and describes its mission as "to support cultural identity, sovereignty, and self-determination while meeting the needs of native and non-native students". The college's focus is on "Kumeyaay History, Kumeyaay Ethnobotany and traditional Indigenous arts"  It "serves and relies on resources from the thirteen reservations of the Kumeyaay Nation situated in San Diego county". In the fall of 2016, Cuyamaca College began offering an associate degree in Kumeyaay Studies with courses at its Rancho San Diego campus, as well as at Kumeyaay Community College on the Sycuan reservation.

The Sycuan Institute on Tribal Gaming was also established at SDSU by the Sycuan Band with the focus on research and policy related to the tribal gaming industry.

Population

Estimates for the pre-contact populations of most native groups in California have varied substantially. In 1925, Alfred L. Kroeber proposed that the population of the Kumeyaay in the San Diego region in 1770 had been about 3,000. More recently, Katharine Luomala points out that this estimate depended on calculations of rates of baptisms at the Mission, and as such "ignores the unbaptized". She suggests that the region could have supported 6,000–9,000 people. Florence C. Shipek goes further, estimating 16,000–19,000 inhabitants.

In the late eighteenth century, it is estimated that the Kumeyaay population was between 3,000 and 9,000. In 1828, 1,711 Kumeyaay were recorded by the missions. The 1860 federal census recorded 1,571 Kumeyaay living in 24 villages. The Bureau of Indian Affairs recorded 1,322 Kumeyaay in 1968, with 435 living on reservations. By 1990, an estimated 1,200 lived on reservation lands, while 2,000 lived elsewhere.

Tribes and reservations

Villages

Present-day cities with Kumeyaay village origins

 Kosa'aay (Cosoy) (San Diego)
 Pa-tai (Ensenada)
 Pawai (Poway)
 Sinyweche (Santee)
 Tecate
 Tecuan (Tijuana)

Other former villages in the US
In the City of San Diego:
Nyip 'ewai (Nipaquay) (Mission Valley)
Matt Xtaat (Choyas) (Barrio Logan)
Utay (Otay Mesa)
Jamo (Pacific Beach)
'Iilh Taawaa (Ystagua) (Sorrento Valley)
Milh Ixox (Melijo) (Tijuana River Valley)
Onap (San Clemente Canyon)
Tisirr (Downtown San Diego)
Totakamalam (Point Loma)
Sinyau-Pichkara (Rancho Bernardo)
Awil-Nyawa (Rancho Penasquitos)
Ahwell-ewa (North City, San Diego)
Hatam's Village (within the former Native American neighborhood in San Diego) (Balboa Park)
In the County of San Diego
Chaip/Chayp (Chula Vista)
Meti (National City, California)
Neti (Spring Valley, San Diego County, California)
'Aa Kuskilly (Apusquel) (Bonita, California)
Tapin/Jacunmat (El Cajon)
Matt Tumau (Matamo) (El Cajon near Dehesa, California)
Milh 'Ewa (Michegua) (Sycramore Canyon, Santee, California)
Alyshuhwi (Imperial Beach)
Hayal/Jayal (Olivenhain, Encinitas)
Hakutl (Encinitas)
Kulaumai (Solana Beach)
Tehayiiw/Ajopunquile (La Costa)
Hamashaw (Jamacha)
Canapu (Ramona, California)
Shpank/Epegam (Ballena, California)
Hapatul
Cojuat
Hakwa (Anza-Borrego)
Hortluke (near Ranchita)
Winal (near Ocotillo Wells)
Wi-i (near Ocotillo Wells)
In Imperial County
Kwpol (Imperial, California)
Sitcarknyewa (near Brawley, California)
Matakal (near Rockwood, California)
Hacamikalau

Other former villages in Mexico
In the Municipality of Tijuana
Kwa-kwa (Cuero de Venado)
Wanya pu:wam (Cerro de Bonifacia)
We-ilmex (near Presa El Carrizo)
Mat g'tay
Mat Hasil Ewik Kakap (Islas Coronado)
In the Municipality of Tecate
Mat'haina:l (Villareal de San José)
Cikaú (Tanama)
Mat'kwoho:l (Cañon Manteca)
Uap 'cu:l uit (Cañon Manteca)
Ja-kwak-wak (Las Juntas)
Hacamum/Ha'kumum (Agua Tule)
Metot'tai (Valle de las Palmas)
Kwat' Kunšapax (Las Calabazas)
Cukwapa:l (El Compadre)
'Ui'ha'tumer
Mutu Cata (Cañon del Cansio)
Jat'ám (Santa Clara)
Ha'mat'tai (Jamatay)
Ha'kume (Ejido Jacume)
In the Municipality of Mexicali
Hwat Nyaknyuma (Ejido Lázaro Cárdenas)
Wekwilul
Hakwisiay
In the Municipality of Ensenada
Jhlumúk (Valle de Guadalupe)
Jiurr-jiurr (Agua Escondida)
Kwar Nuwa (El Sauzal)
'Ui'cikwar (Real del Castillo)
Yiu kwiñi:l (Ojos Negros)
Ha'cur (San Salvador)
Hispap
Matnuk
Hakwisay
Hacukpin
Hameskiny

See also
 Kumeyaay traditional narratives
 Kumeyaay astronomy
 O. M. Wozencraft negotiated the Treaty of Santa Ysabel on January 7, 1852.
 Sycuan Institute on Tribal Gaming at San Diego State University
 Viejas Arena at San Diego State University
 Viejas Casino

References

Bibliography
 
 
 
 
 
 
 
 
 
 
 
 
  Master's Thesis.

Further reading
 Du Bois, Constance Goddard. 1904–1906. "Mythology of the Mission Indians: The Mythology of the Luiseño and Diegueño Indians of Southern California." The Journal of the American Folk-Lore Society, Vol. XVII, No. LXVI. p. 185-8 [1904]; Vol. XIX. No. LXXII pp. 52–60 and LXXIII. pp. 145–64. [1906].
 Miskwish, Michael C. Kumeyaay: A History Book. El Cajon, CA: Sycuan Press, 2007. 
 Miskwish, Michael C, and Joel Zwink. Sycuan: Our People, Our Culture, Our History: Honoring the Past, Building the Future. El Cajon, Calif.: Sycuan Band of the Kumeyaay Nation, 2006.

External links

 Kumeyaay.info: The Kumeyaay Tribes Guide — Tribal Bands of the Kumeyaay Nation (Diegueño) — in San Diego County, California + Baja California state, México
 Kumeyaay Information Village, with educational materials for teachers
 Kumeyaay.com, information website of Larry Banegas, Barona Reservation
 Kumeyaay Indian Language and Culture by Sam Brown
 Kumeyaay Community College and its *Kumeyaay Studies Program in conjunction with Cuyamaca College
 Kumeyaay Department at Cuyamaca College
 Mythology of the Mission Indians, by Du Bois, 1904-1906.
 Religious Practices of the Diegueño Indians, by T.T. Waterman, 1910.
 Kumeyaay (Diegueño) language overview at the Survey of California and Other Indian Languages
 A.R. Royo, "The Kumeyaay: San Diego County and Baja
 Corpus of Kumiai and Ko’alh spoken in Baja California, Mexico by Margaret Field from the Archive of the Indigenous Languages of Latin America, containing digital audio and hi-definition video from four Baja Kumiai communities: San Jose de la Zorra, La Huerta, Alamo-Neji, Necua and San Jose Tecate
 
 Samuel Brown recounts  (2010)

 
California Mission Indians
History of San Diego
History of San Diego County, California
History of Baja California
Native American tribes in California
Indigenous peoples in Mexico